Die Apokalyptischen Reiter (German for "The Apocalyptic Riders") is a Weimar, Germany based heavy metal band signed to Nuclear Blast in Europe and The End Records in North America.

Musical style 

The band's original style, featured on their releases up to and including Allegro Barbaro and on a few songs on All You Need Is Love, consists of death/thrash metal blended with melodic compositions. In later albums, the death metal influence declined, resulting in less chaotic composition (often centered around a verse and chorus with a bridge and solo), more constant tempo, longer songs and clean vocals (although not exclusively). This resulted in a more polished and accessible sound. The band uses lyrics in both English and German with a shift from mainly English songs to more German ones on recent albums (Licht is entirely in German).

The release of Have a Nice Trip marked somewhat of a turning point for the band; although they retained the essence of heavy metal, they began experimenting with many other styles of music such as ambient and jazz.

Members 

Current line-up
 Fuchs (Daniel Täumel) – lead vocals, rhythm guitar (1995–present)
 Volk-Man (Volkmar Weber) – bass, screamed vocals (1995–present)
 Dr. Pest (Mark Szakul) – keyboards (1995–present)
 Sir G. (Georg Lenhardt) – drums (2000–present)
 Ady (Adrian Vogel) – lead guitar (2009–present)

Former members
 Skelleton – drums, screamed vocals (1995–2000)
 Pitrone (Peter Pfau) – lead guitar (2002–2008)
 Lady Cat-Man (Cathleen Gliemann) – lead guitar (2008–2009)

Timeline

Discography 

Albums:
 1997 – Soft & Stronger
 1999 – Allegro Barbaro
 2000 – All You Need Is Love
 2003 – Have a Nice Trip (#95 in Germany)
 2004 – Samurai
 2006 – Riders on the Storm (#31 in Germany, #74 in Austria)
 2008 – Licht (#29 in Germany, #49 in Austria, #88 in Switzerland)
 2011 – Moral & Wahnsinn (#18 in Germany, # 41 in Austria, #61 in Switzerland)
 2014 – Tief.Tiefer (#22 in Germany, #72 in Switzerland)
 2017 – Der Rote Reiter (#10 in Germany, # 29 in Austria)
 2021 – The Divine Horsemen
 2022 – Wilde Kinder

Demos:
 1996 – Firestorm (Demo)

EPs:
 1998 – Dschinghis Khan (EP)
 2006 – Friede sei mit Dir (EP)
 2008 – Der Weg (EP)

DVDs:
 2006 – Friede sei mit Dir (live-DVD)
 2008 – Tobsucht (DVD and two live-CDs)
 2009 – Adrenalin

References

External links

Official German homepage
 
Official German fanclub
Nuclear Blast Artist Profile

German heavy metal musical groups
German melodic death metal musical groups
German power metal musical groups
German folk metal musical groups
German thrash metal musical groups
Reggae metal musical groups
German symphonic metal musical groups
Musical groups established in 1995
Musical quintets
Nuclear Blast artists
Four Horsemen of the Apocalypse in popular culture